The Organising Bureau of European School Student Unions (OBESSU) is the umbrella organization of 32 national school student unions from 24 European countries. An interlocutor with the European Commission, European Parliament, Council of Europe and UNESCO, OBESSU is a full member of the Lifelong Learning Platform (LLLP) and the European Youth Forum (YFJ), and an associate member of the European Students' Union.

History
OBESSU was founded in Dublin, Ireland in April 1975 by national student unions from Sweden, Norway, Finland, Denmark, the United Kingdom and Ireland. The initial aim of the organisation was to create a pan-European school student organisation that could be a platform for cooperation between the national school student unions. By 1980 the platform had added members from Austria, Switzerland, Luxembourg and West Germany and throughout the next decade expanded its membership across Europe. In 1985 OBESSU declared its support for COSAS (the Congress of the South African Students) in their struggle against the apartheid regime.

In 1987, the first international school student meeting was organised in La Havana where representatives of the OBESSU board and many of OBESSU’s Member Organisations participated. The same year, representatives from the USSR, Czechoslovakia, Hungary and DDR joined an OBESSU conference in Strasbourg with the aim to establish a more stable contact between the national school student unions in Eastern and Western Europe. In 1995 OBESSU launched a project to support the growth of school student unions in central and Eastern Europe. Since the early nineties national organisations have been established in Slovenia, Slovakia, Macedonia, and Hungary.In 1999 OBESSU launched the UNBASCO project which focused on supporting the stabilisation of school student unions in the Baltic countries, leading to the inclusion of student unions from Estonia and Lithuania.

In April 2005, the 30th Anniversaire Celebrations of the foundation of OBESSU were celebrated in Dublin, Ireland and hosted by the Union of Secondary Students. On 7 December 2011, OBESSU was awarded the 3rd Civil Society Prize during the plenary session of the European Economic and Social Committee for the ‘Light on the Rights’ Bus Tour project.

Objectives
OBESSU works to:
 represent the school students as stakeholders of their educational systems, and in issues concerning their lives;
 provide the national school student unions with assistance and support and to co-operate for the development of school student representative structures;
 encourage and enable exchange of experience and good practice among the national school students unions;
 promote equal access to education and to strive for the end of all discrimination and injustice within the educational systems;
 contribute to the development of democratic educational systems in Europe, that promote active citizenship in all forms;
 promote solidarity and understanding between young people.

Structure
A General Assembly (GA) serves as the highest decision-making body. The General Assembly meets annually and have authority over the statutes, the political platform and the workplan, as well as electing the Board of OBESSU, the highest decision making body between the GA and Council of Members. The Board is elected annually with overlapping mandates. In this way not all Board members are elected in the same year. The Board consists of 5 members and is responsible for leading and representing the organisation between the General Assemblies. The current members of the Board are Nadine Toye (ISSU, Ireland), Alexandra Seybal (AKS, Austria), Caridad Alarcón (CANAE, Spain), Petr Franc (CSU, Czech Republic) and Rares Voicu (CNE, Romania).

Between every General Assembly there is a Council of Members (COMEM), which is the second highest decision-making body within OBESSU. The Board and the Secretary General coordinate the daily work of the organisation. OBESSU has a European secretariat based in Brussels, in an office it shares with the European Students' Union and other NGOs. Besides the Secretary General, the secretariat consists of a Programme Manager, a Policy and Communications Manager, a Finance and Project Officer, a Projects and Capacity Building Officer, a Project and Policy Officer, a Membership and Communication Officer, a Finance and HR Officer, an External Financial Manager, a Research and Policy Assistant, a Membership and Outreach Assistant, a Capacity Building Assistant and a Research and Policy Assistant.

Activities
OBESSU fights for the interests of all school students in Europe, represents its Member Organisations towards the relevant bodies and institutions, acts as a coordinating body for national and regional school student organisations, unions and structures in Europe, organises activities for its member organisations and initiates a dialogue with and between stakeholders in education

OBESSU organises approximately 10 conferences per year all dealing with education-related topics. OBESSU also works with its ESU counterparts to promote and coordinate the 17th of November as International Students' Day.

Members
The Member Organisations and Candidate Organisations of OBESSU are:

See also
 Student voice
 Organizing model

References

External links
 

European student organizations